ŠK Šurany is a Slovak association football club located in Šurany.

Colors and badge 
Its colors are light blue and black.

League history
Slovak League only (1993–present)
{|class="wikitable" style="text-align:center;"
! style="color:#00308F; background:#FFBF00;"| Season
! style="color:#00308F; background:#FFBF00;"| Division (Name)
! style="color:#00308F; background:#FFBF00;"| Pos./Teams
! style="color:#00308F; background:#FFBF00;"| Pl.
! style="color:#00308F; background:#FFBF00;"| W
! style="color:#00308F; background:#FFBF00;"| D
! style="color:#00308F; background:#FFBF00;"| L
! style="color:#00308F; background:#FFBF00;"| GS
! style="color:#00308F; background:#FFBF00;"| GA
! style="color:#00308F; background:#FFBF00;"| P
! style="color:#00308F; background:#FFBF00;"|Slovak Cup
! style="color:#00308F; background:#FFBF00;"|Top Scorer (Goals)
|-
| 1993–94
| 6th (regional league)
| bgcolor=yellow|1/(16)
| 30
| 22
| 5
| 3
| 82
| 26
| 49
|align=center|Did not enter
|align=center|
|-
| 1994–95
| 5th (regional league)
| ?/(16)
| 
| 
| 
| 
| 
| 
| ?
|align=center|Did not enter
|align=center|
|-
| 1995–96
| 5th (regional league)
| bgcolor=yellow|1/(16)
| 
| 
| 
| 
| 
| 
| ?
|align=center|Did not enter
|align=center|
|-
| 1996–97
| 4th (regional league)
| 6/(16)
| 30
| 13
| 9
| 8
| 54
| 41
| 48
|align=center|Did not enter
|align=center|
|-
| 1997–98
| 4th (regional league)
| ?/(16)
| 
| 
| 
| 
| 
| 
| ?
|align=center|Did not enter
|align=center|
|-
| 1998–99
| 4th (regional league)
| ?/(16)
| 
| 
| 
| 
| 
| 
| ?
|align=center|Did not enter
|align=center|
|-
| 1999–00
| 4th (regional league)
| ?/(16)
| 
| 
| 
| 
| 
| 
| ?
|align=center|Did not enter
|align=center|
|-
| 2000–01
| 4th (regional league)
| bgcolor=red|?/(16)
| 
| 
| 
| 
| 
| 
| ?
|align=center|Did not enter
|align=center|
|-
| 2001–02
| 5th (regional league)
| 6/(15)
| 28
| 14
| 2
| 12
| 61
| 42
| 44
|align=center|Did not enter
|align=center|
|-
| 2012–13
| 4th (regional league)
| 2/(16)
| 30
| 18
| 6
| 6
| 56
| 27
| 60
|align=center|Did not enter
|align=center|
|-
| 2013-14
| 4th (regional league)
| 2/(16)
| 30
| 20
| 5
| 5
| 75
| 24
| 65
|align=center|Did not enter
|align=center|
|-
| 2014-15
| 4th (regional league)
| 10/(16)
| 30
| 11
| 7
| 12
| 54
| 39
| 37
|align=center|Did not enter
|align=center|
|-
| 2015–16
| 4th (regional league)
| bgcolor=yellow|2/(16)
| 30
| 20
| 4
| 6
| 71
| 36
| 64
|align=center|Did not enter
|align=center|
|-
| 2016–17
| 3rd (regional league)
| bgcolor=red|17/(19)
| 36
| 11
| 6
| 19
| 55
| 79
| 39
|align=center|Did not enter
|align=center|
|-
| 2017–18
| 4th (regional league)
| 4/(16)
| 30
| 15
| 7
| 8
| 54
| 36
| 52
|align=center|Did not enter
|align=center|
|-
|}

References

External links
  
Futbalnet profile 

Football clubs in Slovakia